Small Things to a Giant is the debut album of rapper and actor Daveed Diggs, who starred in Hamilton: An American Musical.

Creation and release
Diggs wrote over a dozen rap songs, collaborating with other rappers, including Gunjan Patel, Chukwudi Hodge, Romel Hoskins, Radproductionz, and Rafael Casal. Diggs selected eleven songs, which were recorded at various studios throughout 2011.

Several of the tracks feature guest rappers, including Casal, Hodge, Rob Faron, Moe Green, Lauren Nagal, Big Sizz, and Uncle Suss. Hoskins sings backup for the majority of the album.

Once the album was recorded, it was mixed by Dion Decibels. During this period, album  photography was taken by George X. Lin and Nathan Lee, and edited by Casal.

The album was released for free online streaming and paid digital download on January 2, 2012.

Track List
Fresh From the Hood
(Small Things) To a Giant
Trappers
Jes Grew
Night Time
Dirty World
Go Boi
I Write Rap Songs
Don't Let Me Fall
About my Paper
Small Things (To a Giant)

References

2012 debut albums
Hip hop albums by American artists